Turka may refer to:

Places
Turka, Chełm County, in Lublin Voivodeship (east Poland)
Turka, Lublin County, in Lublin Voivodeship (east Poland)
Turka, Republic of Buryatia, a rural locality in Russia
Turka, Ukraine, a city in Lviv Oblast, Ukraine
Turka Raion, abolished raion in Lviv Oblast
Turka (Lake Baikal), a river in Buryatia, Russia
Turka (Iren), a river in Perm Krai, Russia

Other uses
Cola Turka, a Turkish cola soft drink
Turka (fly), a genus of flies
Turka language, a Gur language spoken by the Turka people in Burkina Faso
Turka people, an ethnic group in Burkina Faso
University of Tartu Folk Art Ensemble (TÜ RKA), an Estonian folk dance group